The Olympic Pool, formerly Swimming Pool of the Central Lenin Stadium is an aquatics center that is part of the Luzhniki Sports Complex in Moscow, Russia. It was opened in 1957 and renovated in 1980. The 10,500-seat venue hosted water polo events at the 1980 Summer Olympics. It also hosted events of the 1973 Summer Universiade, 12th World Festival of Youth and Students, 1986 Goodwill Games, Spartakiads of the Peoples of the USSR and others.

Google satellite images show that the Olympic Pool has been demolished. In official reports by the mayor of Moscow, Sergei Sobyanin states that it will be reconstructed as an Multipurpose Aquatic Centre (link to the full report ). "Apart from the swimming pool, the facility will include a water area with fun rides, a fitness club and a spa centre."

References

External links
 Official webpage
 

Swimming venues in Russia
Sports venues built in the Soviet Union
Sports venues in Moscow
Venues of the 1980 Summer Olympics
Olympic water polo venues